Freedom and Justice (LT), known until 6 June 2020 as the Lithuanian Freedom Union (Liberals), is a conservative liberal political party in Lithuania. It holds soft eurosceptic views.

History
The party was originally founded on 12 July 2014, when the Liberal and Centre Union (LiCS) merged with YES. YES leader Artūras Zuokas became a leader of newly formed party.

In 2015 Lithuanian municipal election the party won 4.91 per cent of votes. Its best performance was in northeast of Lithuania. In 2016 Lithuanian parliamentary election the party won 2.16 per cent of votes in multi-member constituency.

After poor results of 2019 European Parliament elections, Lithuanian Freedom Union (Liberals), Order and Justice and public election committee "Strong Lithuania in United Europe" started negotiations between themselves.

In June 2020, Order and Justice and former MP Arturas Paulauskas' movement "Forward, Lithuania" merged into the party (combining with Artūras Zuokas–led party) and the new movement was renamed to Freedom and Justice. The party was affiliated with ALDE until its merger in 2020.

MPs from Order and Justice, Remigijus Žemaitaitis and Kęstutis Bartkevičius became Freedom and Justice' representatives in the Seimas. In 2020 Lithuanian parliamentary election only Remigijus Žemaitaitis retained his seat. In 2021, Žemaitaitis joined the Lithuanian Regions Parliamentary Group.

Ideology 
The party has a conservative-liberal, centre-right profile and is supportive of both the European Union and NATO. The party is in favour of allowing civil unions for same-sex couples. After it merger with Order and Justice in 2020, the party adopts soft eurosceptic stance on European integration.

The party is economically liberal. It supports the privatization of parts of the health care sector and opposes the establishment of a national development bank. The party favours giving tax incentives to companies that hire seniors and opposes progressive taxation. Instead, it wants to lower value-added taxes.

References

External links
Official website

2014 establishments in Lithuania
Conservative liberal parties
Conservative parties in Lithuania
Liberal parties in Lithuania
National liberal parties
Alliance of Liberals and Democrats for Europe Party member parties
Political parties established in 2014